The 2001 Regal Scottish Open was a professional ranking snooker tournament that took place between 8–15 April 2001 at the AECC in Aberdeen, Scotland. It was the seventh and penultimate ranking event of the 2000/2001 season.

Peter Ebdon won the title by defeating Ken Doherty 9–7 in the final. The defending champion, Ronnie O'Sullivan, was defeated by Mark Davis in the second round.


Main draw

Final

References

2001
Scottish Open
Open (Snooker), 2001
Sports competitions in Aberdeen
April 2001 sports events in the United Kingdom